Richard Vincent (1846 – 17 September 1924) was an English cricketer born in London. He was active from 1886 to 1887 on a tour of New Zealand, where he appeared in one first-class match. He scored 9 runs.

Notes

1846 births
1924 deaths
English cricketers
Wellington cricketers